The 1934 Kansas State Wildcats football team represented Kansas State University in the 1934 college football season.  The 1934 team went undefeated in the Big Six Conference, and won the conference championship.  It was the first major conference championship in school history, and the first since the team won the Kansas Intercollegiate Athletic Association title in 1912.  It would be another 69 years until the Wildcats would win their next conference title, the Big 12 championship in 2003.

The Kansas State team was led by future Hall-of-Fame coach Lynn "Pappy" Waldorf, who would depart from the school following his one championship season.  At the conclusion of the season, tackle George Maddox was named a first-team All-American player by several organizations (including the All-America Board), becoming the third player in team history to be so honored. The Wildcats scored 149 points and gave up 89 points.

Schedule

References

Kansas State
Kansas State Wildcats football seasons
Big Eight Conference football champion seasons
Kansas State Wildcats football